Panko or Votes for Women is a card game about the women's suffrage movement.

Game play 
The game "pits opponents and supporters of suffrage against each other in a game similar to rummy." The game contains forty-eight cards, divided into six different categories.

Background 
The game was published and manufactured by Peter Gurney in 1909 in London.

The game was named after Emmeline Pankhurst, an English suffragette and leader of women's suffrage in the United Kingdom. The cards were designed by Edward Tennyson Reed, an English political cartoonist and illustrator well known for his work in the magazine Punch. The cards featured images of prominent figures of the women's suffrage movement in the United Kingdom.

The game was widely advertised and distributed by the Women's Social and Political Union, along with private merchants. Packs of the game originally sold for two shillings.

The "translation of the women's suffrage movement into card games, and also board games, helped bring the message of the cause into domestic circles where more overt forms of propaganda might not have been welcomed."

See also 
 Pank-a-Squith

References 

Women's suffrage in the United Kingdom
Women's Social and Political Union
British card games
Card games introduced in 1909